ChinaJoy or China Digital Entertainment Expo & Conference is a digital entertainment expo held annually in Shanghai, China. It is the largest gaming and digital entertainment exhibition held in China and Asia. ChinaJoy 2011, 2012, 2013 and 2014 took place at the Shanghai New International Expo Center (SNIEC).

References

External links

 ChinaJoy website 
 ChinaJoy website 
 The 4th China Digital Entertainment Expo & Conference (ChinaJoy) (Shanghai Cultural Information) 
 China Digital Entertainment Expo & Conference (2010). In Show Intro. Second part. Retrieved 11 August 2010.

2004 establishments in China
Annual events in China
Recurring events established in 2004
Trade fairs in China
Tourist attractions in Shanghai
Video game trade shows
Video gaming in China